Wamboin is a rural-residential area in the Southern Tablelands of New South Wales, Australia in the County of Murray, Queanbeyan-Palerang Regional Council LGA.  It is approximately 16 kilometres north-east of the Australian city of Canberra.

It should not be confused with the Parish of Wamboyne, near West Wyalong, NSW, the rural locality of Wamboin near The Marra in central northern NSW, nor the village of Wonboyn on the far south coast of NSW.

Wamboin is about 20 minutes drive from the Canberra CBD, 25 minutes from the Woden Town Centre, and about 10 minutes drive from the city of Queanbeyan.  Services in the area include a local Church (Anglican), community centre, recycling area at the community centre, waste transfer station (at Macs Reef Road, Bywong) and rural fire brigade.

Community organisations include the Wamboin Community Association, a bookgroup, golf club, Greenways Renewal Working Group (GRoW), Landcare, Playgroup, Pony Club, Wildcare and Wonderful Women of Wamboin (WWoW).

The name Wamboin is probably derived from Wiradjuri , meaning "large grey kangaroo", though Wamboin is some distance from Wiradjuri country, and the Ngunnawal people, whose country lies between Wamboin and Wiradjuri country had, and have, a different word for kangaroo (buru).

The modal age was 46. 41.1% of those aged 15 years and above   stated that their qualifications were at the bachelor's degree or higher level.

The Wamboin Community Association provides a range of community services, and represents the community at policy forums, etc. It conducts a market at the community hall, located on Bingley Way, on the third Saturday of the month, except in winter. It has available online, and in printed form at the monthly markets, a comprehensive New Residents' Pack.

References

External links 

www.wamboincommunity.asn.au Wamboin Community Association Website
www.bywongcommunity.org.au Website of Neighbouring Community Bywong

Towns in New South Wales
Southern Tablelands
Queanbeyan–Palerang Regional Council
Localities in New South Wales